Upsilon Ceti, Latinized from υ Ceti, is a solitary star in the equatorial constellation of Cetus. It is visible to the naked eye with an apparent visual magnitude of 3.95. Based upon an annual parallax shift of 11.14 mas, it is located about 293 light years from the Sun.

This star was designated Upsilon Ceti by Bayer and 59 Ceti by Flamsteed.  Flamsteed also gave it the designation Upsilon2 Ceti to distinguish it from 56 Ceti, which he called Upsilon1. Flamsteed's superscripted designations, however, are not in general use today.

Upsilon Ceti is an evolved red giant star with a stellar classification of M0III and is listed as a standard for that class.  The star has previously been classified as K5/M0III, an interesting example of one of the "gaps" in the Morgan-Keenan classification system, with K6-9 often not used for giant stars or used only to indicate a fraction of the way between K5 and M0.

There is an 84% chance that it is on the red giant branch, or 16% to be on the horizontal branch. Stellar models based on the red giant branch status yield an estimated mass of around 126% of the Sun's mass and 54 times the radius of the Sun. This model indicates the star radiates around 550 times the solar luminosity from its outer atmosphere at an effective temperature of 3,822 K.

References

External links 

http://www.alcyone.de/cgi-bin/search.pl?object=HR0585 
http://server3.wikisky.org/starview?object_type=1&object_id=714

Cetus, Upsilon
Asymptotic-giant-branch stars
Cetus (constellation)
Cetus, Upsilon
BD-21 358
Ceti, 59
012274
009347
0585